Bessera elegans, also known by the common name coral drops, is a cormous herbaceous perennial  flowering plant in the family Asparagaceae, from Mexico.

Description
Height: Up to 70 cm.
Flowers: Umbels of pendant, showy scarlet-and-white coloured flowers.
Leaves: Attenuated, erect leaves.

Distribution
Native to central and southern Mexico, B. elegans is also cultivated as an ornamental.

Gallery

References

External links 

 Bessera elegans at The Plant List
 Bessera elegans at Tropicos

Brodiaeoideae
Endemic flora of Mexico
Flora of Central Mexico
Flora of Southern Mexico
Plants described in 1829